The University of Bohol, also referred to by its acronym U.B., is a private nonsectarian co-educational basic and higher education institution institution of higher learning in Tagbilaran City, Bohol, Philippines. It is the first university to be established in the province of Bohol.

History 
It was established as the Rafael Palma College in 1946. Its main building is situated along Maria Clara Street.

Notable alumni
 Rear Admiral Margarito Villamor Sanchez Jr. AFP
 Napoleon Abueva, national artist in sculpture

References

External links 
 University of Bohol website

Universities and colleges in Bohol
Education in Tagbilaran
Educational institutions established in 1946
1946 establishments in the Philippines